Ripwire is a British company that sells Internet and telecommunications services, including hosting, broadband Internet connections, VOIP and interactive multi-touch software applications.

History 
The company traces its history back to October 2008, when founder Liam Winder signed agreements with Freedom4 Communications plc'' to use their 3.6 GHz, 4Ghz and 28 GHz licensed WiMAX spectrum in various cities in the UK.

Since this time, Ripwire has gone on to roll out wireless access across the UK including the Rhondda Cynon Taff valleys in South Wales.

Recently in April 2010, Ripwire announced availability of a VDSL2 service in South Yorkshire that brings 40Mb internet for homes and businesses across the Digital Region network.

As of February 2012, Ripwire have gone into administration.

RiPWiRE Email
Dear RiPWiRE customers,

As you may be aware RiPWiRE has unfortunately had to cease trading as of 01/02/2012. An option to maintain the current client requirements is in negotiation with a leading provider and a conclusion to those negotiations should be reached tomorrow. In the meantime core internet access and service is being maintained by RiPWIRE.

RiPWiRE's network is and has always been independent of Digital Region and as of this time is under our control only.
We are not in a position to provide any 1st line support at this time.

Liam Winder
Managing Director
RiPWiREAcquired by Ask4'''

Have been acquired by Ask4 (one of the other Digital Region ISPs).

External links
Official company site
Official Freedom4 site
Official Digital Region site

Internet technology companies of the United Kingdom